Cham Qoroq (also Romanized as Cham Ghoraq; also known as Cham Foroq) is a village in Koregah-e Gharbi Rural District, in the Central District of Khorramabad County, Lorestan Province, Iran. At the 2006 census, its population was 396, in 72 families.

References 

Towns and villages in Khorramabad County